The Chairman of the Joint Chiefs of Staff, previously the Chief of Staff, is the office for the head of the Jordanian Armed Forces held by a lieutenant general or higher ranking officer. 

Major general Yousef Huneiti is the current Chairman, who was appointed to this position on 24 July 2019. Huneiti is the first Jordanian Air Force commander to be appointed Chairman.

Chairman of the Joint Chiefs of Staff

Arab Legion (1920–1956)

Jordanian Armed Forces (1956–present)

See also
 Arabization of the Jordanian Army command
 Jordanian military ranks

References

Arab Legion
Joint Chiefs of Staff, Chairman
Jordan
Joint Chiefs of Staff, Chairman